Abu Yahya may refer to:
Abu Yahya (author) (born 1969), Pakistani writer and novelist.
Abu Yahya ibn Abd al-Haqq (died ca. 1258), Marinid ruler
Abu Yahya al-Libi (1963–2012), Islamist ideologue and leading high-ranking official within al-Qaeda
Abdul Rahman Saleem (born ca. 1975), British-Iranian Islamic activist
Zakariya al-Qazwini (1203–1283), Persian physician
Abu Talib Yahya (951–1033), imam of the Zaydiyyah sect in 1020–1033
Abu Zakariya Yahya al-Wattasi (died 1448), vizier of the Marinid sultan of Fez, regent and effective strongman ruler of Morocco from 1420 until 1448
Yaghmurasen Ibn Zyan (1206–1283), founder of the Abdelwadid dynasty
Abu Zakariya (1203–1249), the founder and first ruler of the Hafsid dynasty in Ifriqiya
 Abu Yahya Muhammad ibn Ali ibn Abi Imran al-Tinmalali, the last Muslim governor of Majorca before its conquest by James I of Aragon in 1229